Rubus saxatilis, or stone bramble, is a species of bramble widespread across Europe and Asia from Iceland and Spain east as far as China. It has also been found in Greenland.

The green stems are 20–60 cm tall and covered with minute needle-like prickles, and leaves are usually compound with three leaflets. The spherical fruit is red and 1–1.5 cm in diameter, and contains large pips.

Description
The stone bramble is a perennial plant with biennial stems which die after fruiting in their second year. It sends out long runners which root at the tip to form new plants. The stems are rough with many small spines. The alternate leaves are stalked. Each leaf consists of three oval leaflets with serrated margins, the terminal leaflet having a short stalk and the other two being slightly smaller. The inflorescence is a few-flowered corymb. The calyx of each flower has five sepals and the corolla is composed of five narrow white petals. There is a bunch of stamens and there are several pistils. The fruit is an aggregate of several red, fleshy drupes.

Habitat
The stone bramble can form dense clumps, spreading by means of its runners. It can also spread by seed as its edible fruit are eaten by birds which deposit the seeds elsewhere in their droppings. It flourishes in damp woods and rough places and can grow vigorously in clearings created by felling trees.

Uses

Edible uses

The berries are edible raw or cooked, and have an acid flavor, but are agreeable to the palate. In Russian cuisine, they are eaten plain with sugar, honey, or milk, and can be used in preparation of kissel, kompot, juice, syrup, jams and jellies, and kvass.

Medicinal uses
Many parts of the plant are astringent, owing largely to the presence of tannins. A decoction of the root was once used in India for the treatment of relaxed bowels and dysentery, and also in treating the spasmodic stage of whooping cough. A decoction of the leaves was used to treat dysentery and some types of bleeding.

Other uses
A purple to dull blue dye can be obtained from the fruit.

References

External links

 West Highland Flora, Flowering plants and ferns growing wild in the West Highlands of Scotland
 National Museums Northern Ireland, 2010, flora of Northern Ireland
 photo of herbarium specimen at Missouri Botanical Garden
 

saxatilis
Plants described in 1753
Taxa named by Carl Linnaeus
Flora of Europe
Flora of Asia
Russian cuisine
Flora of Greenland